Trina Lynn Thompson (born June 3, 1961) is American judge who serves as a United States district judge of the United States District Court for the Northern District of California. She previously served as a state court judge of the Alameda County Superior Court.

Education 

Thompson received her Bachelor of Arts from the University of California, Berkeley in 1983 and her Juris Doctor from the UC Berkeley School of Law in 1986.

Career 

From 1986 to 1991, Thompson served as a law clerk and later as a deputy public defender in the Alameda County Public Defender's Office. From 1991 to 2000, she served as a criminal defense attorney at her own law firm, The Law Offices of Trina Thompson-Stanley. From 2000 to 2002, she was a Juvenile Court Commissioner in Alameda County Superior Court. In 2002, she was elected as a judge on the Alameda County Superior Court in Oakland, California; she was the first African-American woman elected to the court. She was sworn-in in January 2003. In 2011, President Barack Obama appointed Thompson to serve on the Coordinating Council on Juvenile Justice and Delinquency Prevention. From 2014 to 2021, she was a lecturer at the University of California, Berkeley and since 2018 she has been an adjunct professor at the UC Berkeley School of Law.

Federal judicial service 

On November 3, 2021, President Joe Biden nominated Thompson to serve as a United States district judge of the United States District Court for the Northern District of California. President Biden nominated Thompson to the seat vacated by Judge Phyllis J. Hamilton, who assumed senior status on February 1, 2021. On January 3, 2022, her nomination was returned to the President under Rule XXXI, Paragraph 6 of the United States Senate; she was later renominated the same day. On February 16, 2022, a hearing on her nomination was held before the Senate Judiciary Committee. On March 10, 2022, her nomination was reported out of committee by a 12–10 vote. On May 17, 2022, the United States Senate invoked cloture on her nomination by a 51-46 vote. On May 18, 2022, her nomination was confirmed by a 51–44 vote. She received her judicial commission on August 5, 2022.

See also 
 List of African-American federal judges
 List of African-American jurists

References

External links 
 

 

1961 births
Living people
20th-century American lawyers
20th-century American women lawyers
21st-century American judges
21st-century American women judges
African-American judges
African-American lawyers
California state court judges
Judges of the United States District Court for the Northern District of California
Lawyers from Oakland, California
Public defenders
Superior court judges in the United States
UC Berkeley School of Law alumni
UC Berkeley School of Law faculty
United States district court judges appointed by Joe Biden
University of California, Berkeley alumni
University of California, Berkeley faculty